Robert Vladislavić  (born 12 August 1968) is a retired Croatian football defender who played for Hajduk Split and HNK Rijeka.

Vladislavić was lightning fast and is an uncle of Frane Vladislavić.

References

External links

1968 births
Living people
Association football defenders
Yugoslav footballers
Croatian footballers
HNK Hajduk Split players
HNK Rijeka players
Yugoslav First League players
Croatian Football League players